Ulotaront (developmental codes SEP-363856, SEP-856) is an investigational antipsychotic that is undergoing clinical trials for the treatment of schizophrenia and Parkinson's disease psychosis. The medication was discovered in collaboration between PsychoGenics Inc. and Sunovion Pharmaceuticals using PsychoGenics' behavior and AI-based phenotypic drug discovery platform, SmartCube. Ulotaront is in Phase III of clinical development.

Research has shown that ulotaront results in a greater reduction from baseline in the PANSS total score than placebo. Treatment with ulotaront, as compared with placebo, was also associated with an improvement in sleep quality. Ulotaront was awarded a Breakthrough Therapy designation due to its increased efficacy and greatly reduced side effects compared to current treatments.

Adverse effects
The adverse effect profile of ulotaront differs from that of other antipsychotics because its mechanism of action does not involve antagonism of dopamine receptors in the brain, which is responsible for the drug-induced movement disorders (like akathisia) that may occur with those agents. Some adverse events reported in preliminary clinical trials are somnolence, agitation, nausea, diarrhea, and dyspepsia.

Pharmacology

Mechanism of action
The mechanism of action of ulotaront in the treatment of schizophrenia is unclear. However, it is thought to be an agonist at the trace amine-associated receptor 1 (TAAR1) and serotonin 5-HT1A receptors. This mechanism of action is unique among available antipsychotics, which generally antagonize dopamine receptors (especially dopamine D2 receptor).

Pharmacokinetics
The precise pharmacokinetic profile of ulotaront has not been reported, though the developer has suggested that the pharmacokinetic data supports once daily dosing.

Research
As of 2018, Sunovion, the maker of another antipsychotic called lurasidone (Latuda), is conducting clinical trials on ulotaront in partnership with the preclinical research company PsychoGenics. The U.S. Food and Drug Administration has granted ulotaront the breakthrough therapy designation. In addition to schizophrenia, ulotaront is also being studied for the treatment of psychosis associated with Parkinson's disease.

Interesting facts
Ulotaront and ralmitaront are TAAR1 agonists which have reached clinical trials. The result of adding the first two letters of names "ralmitaront" and "ulotaront" to each other forms the name "Raul". Raul Gainetdinov is one of the pioneers in Trace-Amine Associated Receptors' research.

See also 
 List of investigational antipsychotics § Monoamine receptor modulators

References 

5-HT1A agonists
Amines
Antipsychotics
Experimental drugs
TAAR1 agonists
Thiophenes